A Dry White Season is a 1989 American drama film directed by Euzhan Palcy and starring Donald Sutherland, Jürgen Prochnow, Marlon Brando, Janet Suzman, Zakes Mokae and Susan Sarandon. It was written by Colin Welland and Palcy, based upon André Brink's novel A Dry White Season. Robert Bolt also contributed uncredited revisions of the screenplay. It is set in South Africa in 1976 and deals with the subject of apartheid. Brando was nominated for the Academy Award for Best Supporting Actor.

Plot

In 1976, in South Africa during apartheid, Ben Du Toit (Donald Sutherland) is a South African school teacher at a school for whites only. One day, the son of his gardener, Gordon Ngubene (Winston Ntshona), gets beaten by the white police after he gets caught by the police during a peaceful demonstration for a better education policy for black people in South Africa. Gordon asks Ben for help. After Ben refuses to help because of his trust in the police, Gordon gets caught by the police as well and is tortured by Captain Stolz (Jürgen Prochnow). Against the will of his wife Susan (Janet Suzman) and his daughter Suzette (Susannah Harker), Ben tries to find out more about the disappearance of his gardener by himself. Following the discoveries of the murders of both Gordon and his son by the police, Ben decides to bring this incident up before a court with Ian McKenzie (Marlon Brando) as lawyer but loses. Afterwards, he continues to act by himself and supports a small group of black people, including his driver Stanley Makhaya (Zakes Mokae), to interview others to promote social change.

The white police notice their intentions and detain some responsible persons. To file a civil suit, Ben collects affidavits and hides the information at his house. Ben lets his son in on his plans. His son and his daughter both get to know the hiding spots, and after the police search through Ben's house, there is an explosion next to the hiding spot because the daughter betrayed it to the police, but the son saved the documents. Gordon's wife, Emily (Thoko Ntshinga), is killed when she refuses to be evicted from her home. Ben's wife and daughter leave him. The daughter offers to her father to get the documents to a safer place.

They meet at a restaurant and Ben gives his daughter unbeknownst-to-her fake documents, which she delivers to Captain Stolz. Instead of giving her the documents, Ben passed her a book about art. At the end, Ben is run over by Stolz, who is later shot by Stanley in revenge.

Cast
 Donald Sutherland as Ben du Toit
 Janet Suzman as Susan du Toit
 Susannah Harker as Suzette du Toit
 Rowen Elmes as Johan du Toit
 Marlon Brando as Ian McKenzie
 Susan Sarandon as Melanie Bruwer
 Leonard Maguire as Professor Bruwer
 Zakes Mokae as Stanley Makhaya
 Winston Ntshona as Gordon Ngubene
 Thoko Ntshinga as Emily Ngubene
 Bekhithemba Mpofu as Jonathan Ngubene
 Jürgen Prochnow as Captain Stolz
 Michael Gambon as Magistrate
 John Kani as Julius
 Gerard Thoolen as Colonel Viljoen
 David de Keyser as Susan's father

Production
Before production, Warner Brothers passed on the project and it went to MGM. Director Euzhan Palcy was so passionate about creating an accurate portrayal on film that she traveled to Soweto undercover, posing as a recording artist, to research the riots. Actor Brando was so moved by Palcy's commitment to social change that he came out of a self-imposed retirement to play the role of the human rights lawyer; he also agreed to work for union scale ($4,000), far below his usual fee. The salaries of Sutherland and Sarandon were also reduced and the film was budgeted at only $9 million. Euzhan Palcy became the first female director and the first black director, to direct Marlon Brando.

The film was shot at Pinewood Studios, Buckinghamshire, England and on location in Zimbabwe.

Soundtrack
Dave Grusin composed the score that is mostly on the subtle side for the movie. There is no major theme here other than South African trumpeter Hugh Masekela's mournful flugelhorn passages during the film's saddest scenes. Kritzerland released the soundtrack on CD, featuring 15 songs from the film's soundtrack and four added "bonus tracks" (two alternative takes and two source cues). The CD of the soundtrack fails to mention contributing musicians, including Hugh Masekela, nor includes any of the three Ladysmith Black Mambazo songs (written by Joseph Tshabalala) used so prominently in the film.

Reception
The film was released at a time when South Africa was undergoing great political upheaval and regular demonstrations. The film itself was initially banned by South African censors, who said it could harm President F.W. de Klerk's attempts at apartheid reform. The ban was later lifted in September 1989 and the movie was screened at the Weekly Mail Film Festival in Johannesburg.

Brando's performance in the movie earned him an Academy Award nomination for Best Supporting Actor, and he received the Best Actor Award at the Tokyo Film Festival. For her outstanding cinematic achievement, Palcy received the "Orson Welles Award" in Los Angeles.

Box office
A Dry White Season earned $3.8 million in the United States, against a budget of $9 million.

It earned £334,314 in the UK.

Critical reception
The film received mostly positive reviews from critics. Review aggregator Rotten Tomatoes reports that 82% of 72 critics have given the film a positive review, with a rating average of 7.4 out of 10. Brando, in his first film since 1980, was particularly praised for his small but key role as human rights attorney Ian McKenzie.

Chicago Sun-Times critic Roger Ebert called A Dry White Season "an effective, emotional, angry, subtle movie." The Washington Post's Rita Kempley wrote that "A Dry White Season is political cinema so deeply felt it attains a moral grace. A bitter medicine, a painful reminder, it grieves for South Africa as it recounts the atrocities of apartheid. Yes, it is a story already told on a grander scale, but never with such fervor." And Rolling Stone's Peter Travers wrote that director Palcy, "a remarkable talent, has kept her undeniably powerful film ablaze with ferocity and feeling."

Audiences polled by CinemaScore gave the film a rare "A+" grade on an A+ to F scale.

Awards and nominations

See also

 English-language accents in film – South African

References

External links
 
 
 Movie stills
A Dry White Season: Justice Against the Law an essay by Jyoti Mistry at the Criterion Collection

1989 films
1989 crime drama films
American drama films
American courtroom films
1980s English-language films
English-language South African films
Apartheid films
Films based on South African novels
Films scored by Dave Grusin
Films set in South Africa
Films set in 1976
Films shot at Pinewood Studios
Films shot in Zimbabwe
South African drama films
Metro-Goldwyn-Mayer films
Films directed by Euzhan Palcy
1980s American films